Margaret Mahy of New Zealand wrote more than 100 picture books, 40 novels and 20 short story collections, among other works.

Books
Variant titles are given in parentheses, prefaced by "U.S." for titles of US editions, otherwise by "also".

Television

See also

Notes

References

External links
Margaret Mahy bibliography at the University of Auckland Library's New Zealand Literature File
Margaret Mahy selected bibliography, awards list, and biography at the Storylines Children's Literature Charitable Trust website
Margaret Mahy partial screenography, biography, and free streamed videos of Mahy's television work at NZ On Screen
Mahy, Margaret, with short descriptions of many of her books, a biography, and other information at the New Zealand Book Council website.

 In Amazon

Bibliographies of New Zealand writers
Children's literature bibliographies